Augustin Peak is an  spire-shaped peak in the Kichatna Mountains of the Alaska Range, in Denali National Park and Preserve, southwest of Denali.

See also
Mountain peaks of Alaska

References

Alaska Range
Mountains of Matanuska-Susitna Borough, Alaska
Mountains of Alaska
Mountains of Denali National Park and Preserve